Lake Roberge may refer to:

 Lake Roberge (Grandes-Piles)
 Lake Roberge (Lac-Masketsi)